Debra Killings (born July 7, 1966) is an American singer and bass guitarist, notable for extensive session and background vocal work for LaFace Records and Rowdy Records-based artists such as TLC, Monica, and OutKast.

Killings appears on the majority of the recordings in TLC's catalogue, singing background vocals. She also appears on Monica's first two albums (Miss Thang and The Boy is Mine), and has performed both background vocals and bass guitar on several OutKast albums, including ATLiens and Aquemini.

In 2002, Killings signed to Verity Records, and she released her debut solo album, a gospel LP entitled Surrender, in 2003. Killings was the singing voice of Paula Patton's character, Angel Davenport, in the film Idlewild. Killings' recognizable voice is spotlighted in "Moving Cool", the song that the character of Angel first performs in the movie.

Television
Killings is a member of Big Jim's Penthouse Playas, the house band on The Mo'Nique Show. Killings also occasionally plays bass in the house band for Showtime at the Apollo.

Killings also played bass for BET's "Black Girls Rock" all-star band.

Personal life
Killings was born on July 7, 1966, and grew up in Atlanta, Georgia. She is married and has two sons.

Discography
Album

With Princess & Starbreeze:
 Princess & Starbreeze (MCA, 1987)

With Modest Fok:
 Love or the Single Life (EastWest, 1992)

Solo albums
 Surrender (Verity, 2003)
 Open Heaven (Hands Up, 2008)

Singles
 "Message in the Music"
 "It's Gonna Be Lonely"
 "Love or the Single Life"

Other Appearances
 "Fled" Motion Picture Soundtrack (Rowdy, 1996)
 "13th Floor / Growing Old", Outkast on ATLiens (LaFace/Arista/BMG, 1996)
 Various songs, Outkast on Speakerboxxx/The Love Below (Arista/BMG, 2003)
 "Moving Cool", Outkast on Idlewild (LaFace/Jive, 2006)

References

External links
 Debra Killings Official website
 
 Princess & Starbreeze All Music. com []
 Modest Fok All Music.com [|FOK~C]

Year of birth missing (living people)
1960s births
Living people
African-American guitarists
American contemporary R&B singers
American gospel singers
Women bass guitarists
Performers of Christian contemporary R&B music
20th-century American bass guitarists
20th-century women musicians
Dungeon Family members